Syed Abdul Qavi (born 1951 in Lucknow, India), better known by his stage name Rais Ansari (or Rayees Ansari), is an Urdu Indian poet who has performed at the Indian poetic festivals and at festivals in New Delhi and Qatar.

References

Living people
1951 births
Urdu-language poets from India
Writers from Lucknow
Poets from Uttar Pradesh
20th-century Indian poets
Indian male poets
20th-century Indian male writers